Methylthioribose-1-phosphate isomerase is an enzyme that in humans is encoded by the MRI1 gene.

References

Further reading